Agelasta yunnanensis is a species of beetle in the family Cerambycidae. It was described by Stephan von Breuning in 1954. It is known from China.

References

yunnanensis
Beetles described in 1954